Lebanaphididae is an extinct family of aphids in the order Hemiptera. There are at least two genera in Lebanaphididae.

Genera
These two genera belong to the family Lebanaphididae:
 † Lebanaphis Heie, 2000
 † Megarostrum Heie, 2000

References

Sternorrhyncha
Prehistoric insect families